China: Through the Looking Glass was a fashion and art exhibition held from May 7 through August 16, 2015, at the Metropolitan Museum of Art focusing on the impact of Chinese design on Western fashion over the centuries. It was curated by Andrew Bolton with support from Harold Koda). Nathan Crowley was responsible for production design.

Consisting of over 140 examples, each piece of this exhibit is said to embody "haute couture and avant-garde ready-to-wear alongside Chinese art." The exhibit was extremely popular in New York City and resulted in record attendance for the museum, drawing more visitors than that of the previous record holder among popular Costume Institute exhibitions, Savage Beauty. Originally scheduled to run from 7 May to 16 August, it was extended through September 7 and stayed open through the night on its final weekend.

The exhibition inverted Orientalism, choosing to focus on "the East as authentic". The show "aims to readdress Edward Said's notion of Orientalism—a criticism of the West's depictions of the East as patronising and inauthentic."

A documentary film about the exhibition, The First Monday in May, was released in 2016 and is available on Netflix.

Gallery

References

Metropolitan Museum of Art exhibitions
2015 in art
Fashion exhibitions
2015 in New York City